Royal Canadian Marine Search and Rescue (RCMSAR) is a volunteer marine rescue service that saves lives and promotes public recreational boating safety throughout the coastal and some inland waters of the province of British Columbia and is associated with the national organization of the Canadian Coast Guard Auxiliary.

History
In 1978, the Canadian Coast Guard (at the time under the federal Minister of the Department of Transport) established the Canadian Marine Rescue Auxiliary (CMRA) across Canada in order to involve volunteers in a structured way to provide marine rescue assistance and rescue prevention education.  This national auxiliary program provided funding for volunteer operations, such as reimbursement of fuel costs and insurance coverage, when volunteer boats and crews were formally tasked to respond to marine incidents by the Victoria (Joint) Rescue Co-ordination Centre (JRCC) of the Department of National Defence (DND).  Guidance in volunteer training and provision of some specialized rescue and life saving equipment were also provided under this program.  The CMRA underwent a name change to Canadian Coast Guard Auxiliary in 1997.  In the Pacific Region of the federal Department of Fisheries and Oceans, under which the Canadian Coast Guard (Special Operating) Agency now falls, the CCGA-Pacific underwent a rebranding doing business under the name Royal Canadian Marine Search and Rescue or RCMSAR, effective May 2012. The Royal Canadian Marine Search and Rescue Inc., became the legal name of the organization in 2017.  

Volunteers have been an integral part of marine rescue response services along the British Columbia coast for more than 100 years, initially as part of the Canadian Life Saving Service (CLSS).  The Canadian Coast Guard was formally established in 1962 and shortly thereafter engaged volunteers called Volunteer Search Masters (who operated suitable boats equipped with VHF radio communication) and Volunteer Marine Rescue Agents (who were local coastal contacts for Coast Guard Rescue Officers and who established "posts" in coastal communities for providing information and communications related to search and rescue incidents in the nearby waters).

Operations 
About 1,000 volunteers operate more than 30 rescue stations on the west coast and in the British Columbia interior in support of federal marine search and rescue and provincial emergency management mandates.  Collectively they respond to an average of about 800 missions per year, or about a third of all marine emergencies in B.C.  A small paid staff at the RCMSAR Headquarters and Training Centre near Victoria supports operations, training and volunteer members.  RCMSAR receives funding for missions and on-water training from the Canadian Coast Guard through a Contribution Agreement in support of the Coast Guard's marine search and rescue mandate.  Funding is provided by the Province of British Columbia through Community Gaming Grants for vessels and equipment.  RCMSAR also welcomes corporate and private donations.
In 2017, RCMSAR signed a memorandum of understanding with the Province of British Columbia to allow local authorities and provincial agencies to request assistance from RCMSAR directly in times of emergency specifically related to their jurisdictions. Marine search and rescue in federal waters remains RCMSAR's core operation and primary support function. In 2017, RCMSAR also signed a memorandum of understanding establishing a relationship with the 4th Canadian Ranger Patrol Group for the purpose of training and operational collaboration.

Resources

Equipment 
RCMSAR is equipped with a variety of vessels ranging from rigid hull inflatables to large enclosed-cabin waterjet-powered boats.  RCMSAR also operates a training simulator featuring a full-scale enclosed cabin vessel, large screen, digital projectors and sound.  The simulator mirrors RCMSAR's "Brewin" vessel used for on-water training.

Vessels

Type 1 Fast Rescue Craft 
Design: Rigid Hull Inflatable

Length: 9 metres

Power: Twin Yamaha 250hp Outboard Motors

Range: 250 nautical miles

Speed: 40+ knots

Crew Complement: 4

Features:
 Shockwave Integrated Controlled Environment (ICE)
 Self Righting
 Electronic Navigation Instruments
 Two Marine VHF radios
 Searchlights
 Night Vision (FLIR)
 First Aid Equipment
 Towing Equipment

Type 2 Fast Rescue Craft 
Design: Enclosed cabin Rigid Hull Inflatable

Length: 11.12 metres

Power: Twin Diesel Engines and Water Jets (870hp)

Range: 250-300 nautical miles

Speed: 39 knots

Crew Complement: 5

Features:
 Enclosed cabin for longer, more complex missions
 Self-righting
 Electronic navigation instruments
 Three marine VHF radios
 Radio Direction Finders
 Searchlights
 Night vision (FLIR)
 First aid equipment
 Towing equipment

Rigid Hulled Inflatable Boats (RHIBS) 
Various designs are used such as the Zodiac 733 or the Titan 249.

Stations

Southern Region 
 Station 1 - West Vancouver
 Station 2 - North Vancouver
 Station 4 - Squamish
 Station 5 - Crescent Beach
 Station 8 - Delta
 Station 10 - Richmond
 Station 12 - Halfmoon Bay
 Station 14 - Gibsons
 Station 61 - Pender Harbour
 Station 106 - Shuswap

Central Region 
 Station 20 - Salish Sea (Pender Island)
 Station 25 - Gulf Islands
 Station 27 - Nanaimo
 Station 29 - Ladysmith
 Station 31 - Brentwood Bay
 Station 33 - Oak Bay
 Station 34 - Mill Bay
 Station 35 - Victoria
 Station 36 - Saanich
 Station 37 - Sooke
 Station 38 - Ucluelet
 Station 39 - Port Alberni
 Station 43 - Port Alice
 Station 50 - Port McNeill
 Station 59 - Deep Bay
 Station 60 - Comox

Northern Region 
 Station 45 - Masset
 Station 63 - Kitimat
 Station 64 - Prince Rupert
 Station 65 - Lax Kwa´laams
 Station 70 - Hartley Bay
 Station 74 - Gitxaala

SAR Prevention 
 Station 103 - Vancouver

See also
 Canadian Coast Guard Auxiliary

References 

Royal Canadian Marine Search and Rescue: A New Look for B.C.'s Marine Rescuers
New name, new look

External links 
Royal Canadian Marine Search And Rescue

1978 establishments in Canada
Non-profit organizations based in British Columbia
Rescue
Sea rescue organizations
Organizations established in 1978